The 1996 BC Lions finished in fifth place in the West Division with a 5–13 record and failed to make the playoffs.

Offseason

CFL Draft

Preseason

Regular season

Season standings

Season schedule

Awards and records

1996 CFL All-Stars

Western Division All-Star Selections
FB – Sean Millington, Western All-Star
DB – Andre Strode, Western All-Star

1996 Intergold CFLPA All-Stars
OG – Jamie Taras, Intergold CFLPA All-Star

References

BC Lions seasons
BC Lions
1996 in British Columbia